Josip Balatinac (born 7 March 1979) is a Croatian retired football midfielder.

Club career
In 1997 Balatinac joined NK Osijek coming through youth ranks of famous Osijek youth football academy. He spent nine seasons with NK Osijek where he gradually became one of the best players, earning a national team cap.
In the summer of 2006 Balatinac was supposed to join SV Pasching. It's still unclear if Balatinac signed the contract and then went AWOL or if he never even signed for Austrian team. However, Balatinac came back from Austria after few days claiming he's homesick and continue to prepare for new season with NK Osijek. Few weeks afterwards he signed with Hajduk Split. The club's financial problems lead to the club owing Balatinac several wages, and he filed for termination of his contract in early 2007, which was approved in the November of that year. He signed with the Druga HNL side NK Hrvatski Dragovoljac where he spent the rest of the 2007/08 season. Subsequently he all but retired for professional football, playing for a string of lower-tier clubs in his native region of Baranja, settling in Draž last playing for NK Mladost.

International career
He made one appearance for the Croatia national football team, in a friendly against South Korea at the 2006 Carlsberg Cup tournament on 29 January 2006. He has also represented his country at under-21 and under-19 levels.

References

External links
 
 
 
 

1979 births
Living people
People from Popovac
Association football midfielders
Croatian footballers
Croatia youth international footballers
Croatia under-21 international footballers
Croatia international footballers
NK Osijek players
HNK Hajduk Split players
NK Hrvatski Dragovoljac players
Croatian Football League players
First Football League (Croatia) players